Abiola is a Nigerian name of Yoruba origin. The meaning of Abiola is "born in honour, wealth".

Notable people with the surname include:
 Hafsat Abiola (born 1974), Nigerian civil-rights activist
 Moshood Kashimawo Olawale Abiola, Nigerian businessman, publisher, philanthropist and politician.
 Bilikiss Adebiyi Abiola, Nigerian businesswoman

Notable people with the first/given name include:
 Abiola Abrams, American television personality
 Abiola Babatope, Nigerian politician
 Abiola Dauda, Nigerian-Swedish footballer
 Abiola Ajimobi, Nigerian politician
 F. Abiola Irele, Nigerian academic
  Abiola Agoro, Nigerian American organizer and fashion designer

References 

Nigerian names
Yoruba-language surnames
Yoruba given names